Esporte Clube Corinthians, commonly known as Corinthians de Presidente Prudente, was a Brazilian football club based in Presidente Prudente, São Paulo state. They competed in the Série C once.

History
The club was founded on February 8, 1945, Corinthians won the Campeonato Paulista Série A2 in 1959. named after Sport Club Corinthians Paulista. They competed in the Série C in 1996, when they were eliminated in the Second Stage by Rio Branco-PR. The club eventually folded.

Achievements

 Campeonato Paulista Série A2:
 Winners (1): 1959

Stadium

Esporte Clube Corinthians played their home games at Estádio Eduardo José Farah, nicknamed Farahzão. The stadium has a maximum capacity of 44,414 people.

References

Association football clubs established in 1945
Defunct football clubs in São Paulo (state)
1945 establishments in Brazil
2001 establishments in Brazil
Association football clubs disestablished in 2001